Cauly Oliveira Souza (born 15 September 1995), commonly known as Cauly, is a Brazilian professional footballer who plays as a midfielder for  Bahia.

Career
For the 2017–18 season, he moved to MSV Duisburg. For the 2019–20 season, he signed with SC Paderborn. On 13 January 2020, he signed with Ludogorets Razgrad.

Career statistics

Honours
Ludogorets Razgrad
Bulgarian First League: 2019–20, 2020–21, 2021–22
Bulgarian Supercup: 2021, 2022

References

External links

1995 births
Living people
Sportspeople from Bahia
Brazilian footballers
Association football midfielders
SC Fortuna Köln players
MSV Duisburg players
SC Paderborn 07 players
PFC Ludogorets Razgrad players
Esporte Clube Bahia players
3. Liga players
2. Bundesliga players
Bundesliga players
First Professional Football League (Bulgaria) players
Brazilian expatriate footballers
Brazilian expatriate sportspeople in Germany
Expatriate footballers in Germany
Brazilian expatriate sportspeople in Bulgaria
Expatriate footballers in Bulgaria